The Clarendon Weir is a  weir in the Australian state of South Australia, located on the Onkaparinga River in the suburb of Clarendon, about  south of the Adelaide city centre.

Built in 1894–96 as a solution to Adelaide's sewer problems, the weir supplied water to the Adelaide plains to flush the sewers as there simply was not enough water to keep the population healthy. A tunnel was built with ponies and carts through the hills to Happy Valley where a reservoir was built. The water was pumped from the Weir through the tunnel to Happy Valley Reservoir. There is no other catchment for this reservoir.  Mt Bold Reservoir was added in the 1940s to again supplement Adelaide's water supply with the Clarendon Weir acting as a holding dam down stream. The water is used to supply the majority of the Adelaide region's water needs.

The weir was listed on the former Register of the National Estate, and has been listed as a state heritage place on the South Australian Heritage Register since 8 November 1984.

See also
List of reservoirs and dams in Australia

References

External links
 
Postcards: Clarendon
Clarendon Weir (youtube)

Dams completed in 1896
Weirs
Dams in South Australia
South Australian Heritage Register
South Australian places listed on the defunct Register of the National Estate